The 2018 Miami Hurricanes baseball team represented the University of Miami during the 2018 NCAA Division I baseball season. The Hurricanes played their home games at Alex Rodriguez Park at Mark Light Field as a member of the Atlantic Coast Conference. They were led by head coach Jim Morris, in his 25th and final season at Miami. For the second straight season, the Hurricanes failed to reach the NCAA Division I baseball tournament, having done so 44 consecutive times previous to that.

Roster

Coaching staff

Schedule

Rankings

References

Miami Hurricanes
Miami Hurricanes baseball seasons
Miami Hurricanes baseball